The following highways are numbered 526:

Canada
Alberta Highway 526
 Ontario Highway 526

Ireland
 R526 road (Ireland)

South Africa
 R526 (South Africa)

United States
 
 
  (former)